Tariq Hussain, frequently billed as Tariq, is a Canadian singer-songwriter based in Vancouver, British Columbia.

He was born in Cowansville, Quebec. His father, a Pakistani immigrant, was very concerned with his children getting a good education and it was only in his mid-teens, after his father had died, that Hussain began playing guitar. At Bishop's University, he studied theatre arts. He started devoting most of his time to a music career upon moving to Calgary, Alberta in 1995, releasing his first album Splat independently that year.

In 1997, he was signed to EMI Music Canada. His album The Basement Songs was produced by Steven Drake of Odds and won critical acclaim, with music writers citing the maturity of the folk-rock songwriting, as the songs addressed issues of racism and religion. His best-known song, "Chevrolet Way", was a Canadian radio hit in 1997 and garnered him a Juno Award nomination for Best New Artist. His subsequent independent release, While You're Down There included collaborations with Jules Shear and with Charlotte Caffey of The Go-Go's.

In addition to his solo recordings, he has been a collaborating member of Brasstronaut and a host on CBC Radio 3.

In 2011, Hussain won the Maxine Sevack Award for Creative Nonfiction from the University of British Columbia, as well as receiving his master's degree in creative writing from the institution. He currently teaches courses in the Faculty of Arts, mainly focusing on creative and lyric writing.

Discography
 Graffiti Artist (1993)
 Splat (1995)
 The Basement Songs (1997)
 While You're Down There (2001)
 Goodbye Lonely (2005)
 Moonwalker EP (2013)
 Telegrams (2019)

References

External links
 Tariq

1968 births
Canadian male singer-songwriters
Canadian singer-songwriters
Canadian rock singers
Living people
CBC Radio hosts
Musicians from Quebec
People from Cowansville
Canadian musicians of Pakistani descent
University of British Columbia alumni
Academic staff of the University of British Columbia
Canadian folk rock musicians
Canadian indie rock musicians